Rex Arvin Wade (born October 9, 1936) is an American historian and author who has written extensively about the 1917 Russian Revolution. He has taught courses in Russian and Soviet history at George Mason University since 1986.

Career
Born in Piedmont, Kansas, Wade taught at Wisconsin State University, LaCrosse from 1963–68, the University of Hawaii from 1968–86, and as visiting professor at the University of North Carolina, University of Nebraska, and Portland State University, before joining the George Mason faculty in 1986.

Wade has authored numerous books on the subject of the 1917 February and October revolutions, among which include:
The Russian Search for Peace, 1917 (1969); 
Red Guards and Workers' Militias in the Russian Revolution (1984); 
The Russian Revolution, 1917 (2000); 
The Bolshevik Revolution and Russian Civil War (2001).
Revolutionary Russia: New Approaches to the Russian Revolution of 1917 (2004).

He co-edited Politics and Society in Provincial Russia: Saratov, 1590-1917 (1989), and edited Documents of Soviet History (Vol. I, 1991; Vol. II, 1992, Vol. III, 1994).

He retired in 2006 but is currently planning a book, The Long Revolution: Russia 1880-1930.

Notes

External links
Rex Wade GMU Faculty profile

21st-century American historians
21st-century American male writers
Historians of Russia
George Mason University faculty
1936 births
Living people
American male non-fiction writers